In Hinduism, Vaishvanara (pronounced ), meaning "of or related to Visvanara" is an abstract concept. It is related to the soul atman, the (universal) Self or self-existent essence of human beings. Etymologically (the study of the history of words), Vaishvanara is a derivative of the conjoined word Vishvanara i.e. Vishva (Universe) + Narah (Man) i.e. the 'Universal or Cosmic Man'. In the Rig Veda, Vaishvanara is an epithet of the fire god deity Agni.

Forms of Vaishvanara
As per the Mandukya Upanishad, the Self has four aspects or states of consciousness. The first is the Vaishvanara manifestation, under the jagrat or the waking state which is outwardly cognitive. The Self in Vaishvanara form has seven limbs, nineteen mouths and has the capability to experience material objects.

The seven limbs of Vaishvanara pertain to the 'cosmic body' of 'Vaishvanara'. These are enumerated in verse 18.2 of the Chandogya Upanishad,

 [T]he heavens are his head, the sun his eyes, the air his breath, the fire his heart, the water his stomach, the earth his feet, and space his body.

The seven limbs of Vaishvanara have also referred to in the first verse of the Mandukya Upanishad, which have been described to encompass the entire manifest universe. The nineteen "mouths" are

 The five sense organs
 The five organs of action (walking, talking, expelling, procreating, and handling)
 The five pranas
 The four functions of mind (aspects of antahkarana) - the mind (manas), the intellect (buddhi), the ego sense (ahamkara), and thought (çitta)

Further, Agni Vaishvanara is regarded as Author of the Hymns of the Rig-veda (x. 79, 80).

Agning prajvalitang vande Jata-vedang Hutashanang:
Suvarna-varnam amalang samiddhang sarvvatomukham.

 
The Mahanirvana Tantra also refers to certain Vaishvanara:
[O]m Vaishvanara Jataveda ihavaha ihavaha;
lohitaksha, sarvva-karmani sadhaya: svaha.

As per the Tantras, Vaishvanara meaning "Ruling or benefiting all men," is also a name of the tantric goddess Savitri.

See also
Brahman
Glossary of Hinduism terms
Hindu deities
Hindu mythology

References

Hindu philosophical concepts
Vedanta